Cliff Sekete (born 7 September 1992) is a retired Zimbabwean football midfielder.

References

1992 births
Living people
Zimbabwean footballers
Zimbabwe international footballers
Dynamos F.C. players
Association football midfielders
Yadah Stars F.C. players
Gunners F.C. players